Mickey is an American sitcom that aired on ABC from September 1964 to January 1965. Created and produced by Bob Fisher and Arthur Marx, the series starred Mickey Rooney, and was filmed at Metro-Goldwyn-Mayer Studios.

Synopsis
Mickey Grady (Mickey Rooney), a retired businessman from Omaha, Nebraska, inherits the luxury Newport Arms Hotel in Newport Beach, California, and decides to run it.

Cast
Mickey Rooney as Mickey Grady
Emmaline Henry as Nora Grady
Sammee Tong as Sammy Ling

Recurring
Tim Rooney as Tim Grady
Brian Nash as Buddy Grady
Bobby Van as Bobby
Alan Reed as Mr. Swindler

Awards
Rooney won a Golden Globe Award for "Best Actor in a Television Series" at the 21st Annual Golden Globe Awards ceremonies in 1964.

Reception and cancellation
The series failed to sustain ratings to survive the full season in its 9 p.m. Eastern time slot on Wednesdays. Its principal competition was another sitcom, the top-ten series The Dick Van Dyke Show on CBS. NBC ran television movies at the time.

Due to low ratings, ABC was considering canceling Mickey. The network was hesitant to cancel the series due to the popularity of Sammee Tong's character, who had a solid fanbase thanks to Tong's role in Bachelor Father. Rooney wrote in his 1991 autobiography, Life Is Too Short that Tong was upset by the rumor; a heavy gambler who owed money to the mafia, Tong needed the money from the series to pay off his debts. On October 27, 1964, Tong took an overdose of barbiturates and died at his home. Tong's death effectively ended any chance for the series' survival, and ABC canceled Mickey. The series' last episode aired on January 13, 1965.

Episode list

References

External links 
 

1964 American television series debuts
1965 American television series endings
1960s American sitcoms
1960s American workplace comedy television series
American Broadcasting Company original programming
Black-and-white American television shows
English-language television shows
Television series by MGM Television
Television series by Selmur Productions
Television series set in hotels
Television shows set in Newport Beach, California
Inheritances in fiction